"Closer" is a song by American rapper Saweetie from her upcoming debut studio album, Pretty Bitch Music, scheduled to be released in 2023. The song features a guest appearance from American singer-songwriter H.E.R., who sings the chorus and postchorus while Saweetie raps the two verses. It was released on February 11, 2022 as the fifth single from the album.

Composition and lyrics
"Closer" is a disco pop song and has been described as "a confident singles anthem for Valentine's Day". Saweetie's lyrics pair up with H.E.R.'s vocals in the chorus as the two respectively rap and sing "over a bouncy '80s-inspired beat".

Music video
The official music video for "Closer", directed by Hannah Lux Davis, premiered alongside the song on February 11, 2022. It starts with Saweetie and H.E.R. taking a group of women with her to the airport to fly. After getting their passports and COVID-19 test results checked, they start partying and Saweetie then goes on dates with three love interests.

Charts

Weekly charts

Year-end charts

Release history

References

2022 singles
2022 songs
Warner Records singles
Saweetie songs
H.E.R. songs
Songs written by Saweetie
Songs written by H.E.R.
Songs written by Ryan Ogren